Orli Shuka (born 27 May 1976) is a British-Albanian actor best known for his role as Luan, head of the Albanian mafia in Gangs of London. Son of famous Albanian actor Agim Shuka.

Filmography

References

External links 

English male television actors
Albanian male television actors
1976 births
Living people
English male film actors
Albanian male film actors
Male actors from London
21st-century English male actors
21st-century Albanian male actors
Albanian emigrants to England